Sujit Guha (born 23 July 1950) is an Indian film director known for his works in Bengali cinema.

Filmography
 Deewangee ... The Terror of Love (2016)  
 Miss Butterfly (2015)
 Kellafote (2010) 
 Mon Je Kore Uru Uru (2010) Neel Akasher Chandni (2009)
 Mon Mane Naa (2008) 
 Sangharsha  (2007)
 Eri Naam Prem (2006) 
 Agnipath (2005)
 Nayak (2005) 
 Deva (2002)
 Ganga (1998)
 Manasa Kanya (1997)
 Moner Manush (1997)  
 Pratham Dekha (1992)
 Ananda Niketan (1991)  
 Mandira (1990)  
 Aakrosh (1989)  
 Jhankar (1989)  
 Bandini (1989)  
 Asha O Bhalobasha (1989)  
 Dolanchanpa (1987)  
 Amar Sangee (1987)  
 Kshyapa Thakur (1987)
 Bouma (1986) 
 Abhiman (1986)  
 Lalmahal (1986)  
 Dadamoni (1984)  
 Sankalpa (1982)

References

External links

Living people
20th-century Indian film directors
Bengali film directors
People from Jessore District
1950 births
Film directors from Kolkata
21st-century Indian film directors
Indian film directors